Aphia minuta, the transparent goby, is a species of the goby native to the northeastern Atlantic Ocean where it can be found from Trondheim, Norway to Morocco. It is also found in the Mediterranean, Black Sea and the Sea of Azov. It is a pelagic species, inhabiting inshore waters and estuaries. This species can reach a length of  TL. It is an important species to local commercial fisheries. It is currently the only known member of its genus.

Gastronomy 
This fish is appreciated in Spain as part of the Andalusian, Catalan and Valencian cuisines, and in Italy as part of the Italian cuisine. In Andalusia where they are called chanquetes, they are traditionally served deep-fried, with fried eggs and roasted or fried bell pepper. Due to their high price and to their now protected species status in Spain, they are often replaced by some species of East Asian noodlefishes, locally called chanquete chino (Chinese chanquete), Neosalanx tangkahkeii and Protosalanx. This replacement is often done openly, but sometimes it is done fraudulently.

References

External links

transparent goby
Marine fish of Europe
Marine fauna of North Africa
Fish of Western Asia
Fish of the Mediterranean Sea
Fish of the Black Sea
Fish of the North Sea
transparent goby
Monotypic fish genera